Eupithecia thermosaria is a moth in the family Geometridae. It is found in Afghanistan, Jammu & Kashmir, Kyrgyzstan and Tajikistan. The habitat consists of mountainous areas at altitudes between 2,800 and 4,500 meters.

References

Moths described in 1903
thermosaria
Moths of Asia